Pujante is a surname. Notable people with the surname include:

José Antonio Pujante (1964–2019), Spanish politician and philosophy professor
Vicente Fernández Pujante (born 1975), Spanish footballer

Surnames of Spanish origin